Clifton Preparatory School, Nottingham Road is a private, co-educational day and boarding primary school located in the Nottingham Road area of the KwaZulu-Natal Midlands in South Africa.

History
The school was founded in 1942 when a number of Clifton Durban boys moved to the KwaZulu-Natal Midlands over fears of danger during World War II. 

Clifton has added Grade 00 and phased out Grade 8 which traditionally was a boys-only grade.

Boarding
Clifton accepts boy and girl boarders from Grade 1 (age 6) and offers boarding options, from full boarding to weekly and temporary boarding. Clifton is one of the few remaining independent preparatory schools in KwaZulu-Natal that offers full boarding to young children, with boarders coming from around the country and various Southern African countries.

Grounds
The school has 60 hectares of land.

IT
Clifton has campus-wide WiFi providing children access to the Internet, email and servers. The One Laptop per Child program provides every child in Grade 5, 6  and 7 with a NL1 or NL2 Tablet Classmate Netbook.

Notable alumni
Craig Higginson - author The Hill.
Pat Cilliers - Sharks rugby player.
David Miller (South African cricketer) - Dolphins cricket player.
[[Wayne Fyvie]]  - Sharks rugby player.

External links

Boarding schools in South Africa
Nondenominational Christian schools in South Africa
Private schools in KwaZulu-Natal
Educational institutions established in 1942
1942 establishments in South Africa
Umgungundlovu District Municipality